The Bwindi Impenetrable Forest is a large primeval forest located in south-western Uganda in the Kanungu District. The forest contains around 160 species of trees and over 100 species of ferns.

Origin of name 
The name Bwindi is derived from the Runyakitara word Mubwindi and means "a place full of darkness". This name comes from the extensive stands of bamboo interspersed amongst the larger forest hardwoods. The bamboo and thick ground cover of ferns, vines, and other plant growth severely hinder direct access on foot.

Wildlife 
The forest is one of the most biologically diverse areas on Earth. Half of the world's population of the highly endangered mountain gorillas live within its borders. The forest has been recognized by the United Nations Educational, Scientific and Cultural Organization as a World Heritage Site for its biological significance.

At present the forest is believed to contain 120 mammals species, 348 bird species, 220 butterfly species and 27 frog species. Included among the mammals are forest elephants and yellow-backed duikers. While mountain gorillas are the most notable of the forest's primates, other residents include chimpanzees, blue monkeys, l’Hoest’s monkeys, red-tailed monkeys, vervet monkeys and black-and-white colobus monkeys. The forest's birds include great blue turacos, black-billed turacos, black bee-eaters, African green broadbills, handsome francolins, African black ducks and Cassin’s grey flycatchers.

Socioeconomic struggles 
The forest has been described as "Riven by disputes and crosshatched by historical, political, and biological borders" by researcher Craig Stanford, co-director of the park's Jane Goodall Research Center. The forest is the traditional home of the Batwa people, a marginalized community within Ugandan society.

Establishment of a national park 
In 1991, the Bwindi Impenetrable National Park was established, adjacent to the Uganda, Rwanda and DRC border region. The park was create to protect the forest's mountain gorilla population from poachers and habitat loss. Gorilla treks are led on a daily basis into difference sections of the forest so that trekkers can see the mountain gorillas and in so doing generate necessary funds for the protection of these endangered primates. The Batwa people lost their traditional hunting grounds through the establishment of the park.

See also
 Dian Fossey
 Bwindi Impenetrable National Park

References

Forests of Uganda
Afromontane forests
Old-growth forests
Kanungu District

External links